The indoor rowing event at the World Games 2017 was held at the Multifunctional Hall in Jelcz-Laskowice, Poland.
For the first time, indoor rowing was included in the World Games as an invitational sport.

Schedule

Qualifying criteria 
There was a maximum number of participants of 20 for the 2000m races, and 15 for the 500m races.

Each national rowing federation could qualify a maximum of one man and one woman for the 500m event, and one of the 2000m events.

In addition, the 2000m events had universality quotas. For the regions of Africa, Asia, Europe and Latin America & Caribbean, a minimum of 2 athletes from each was required. For Australia & New Zealand, Oceania (excl. AUS & NZ) and USA and Canada, there was a minimum of 1.

Qualification 
For each event, the highest ranked athletes on the Concept2 rankings were taken, and then athletes above the maximum per federation were removed, as were those not meeting the universality quotas, until there was enough athletes qualified.

Participating nations

Medalists 
6 medal events were contested at the World Games, 3 for men and 3 for women.

Men

Women

Medal table

References

External links 
 Indoor Rowing Results at World Games 2017

 
2017 World Games
2017 in rowing
2017